Sandrine Paquier (born 28 February 1977) is a Swiss freestyle swimmer. She competed in three events at the 1996 Summer Olympics.

References

External links
 

1977 births
Living people
Swiss female freestyle swimmers
Olympic swimmers of Switzerland
Swimmers at the 1996 Summer Olympics
Place of birth missing (living people)
20th-century Swiss women